The Ministry of Interior (abbreviated МВР, MVR) of the Republic of Bulgaria is the ministry charged with the national security and the upholding of law and order in the country.

The ministry was established in 1879 under Knyaz Alexander of Battenberg with the first prime minister and interior minister of what was then the autonomous Principality of Bulgaria being Todor Burmov.

The current Minister of Interior in the first cabinet of Prime Minister Kiril Petkov is Ivan Dermendjyev, who previously served as caretaker Minister of Interior during caretaker Prime Minister Stefan Yanev's two consecutive caretaker governments in 2021.

Border Troops 
In the 1980s, the Border Troops (Гранични войски) were a paramilitary formation under the Interior Ministry tasked with guarding Bulgaria's borders. Heavily concentrated on Bulgaria's iron curtain border with NATO members Greece and Turkey the Border Troops would have come under the Ministry of People's Defence in times of war. However, the frontier with Romania was also actively defended. After the Cold War the border troops were reformed as the Border Police.

Until 1946 the Bulgarian border guard was a task of the regular army and each infantry regiment in proximity of the border had a border guard company. In 1946 the new Communist regime formed an independent service, dedicated to the border security on August 10, 1946, as the Border Militsiya, but this name lasted only until October 8, when it was renamed to Border Troops. The service initially numbered 8 Border Sectors (Гранични сектори (ГС)). The service was modeled on the Soviet Border Troops. Unlike them the Bulgarian Border Troops were not part of the State Security service, but subordinated to the Ministry of the Interior (between 1962 and 1972 to the Ministry of People's Defence). The internal structure of the troops was overhauled with ministerial order #44 from March 9, 1950, as follows:
 the highest formations (the Border Sectors) were renamed into Border Detachments (Гранични Отряди (ГО), an equivalent of a motorised rifle regiment in the army, but with a smaller manpower, and increased from 8 to 10)
 the battalion equivalents were renamed from Border Sections to Border Commandatures (Гранични Комендатури (ГК))
 the company equivalents were renamed from Border Subsections to Border Outposts (Гранични Застави (ГЗ))
As a military formation each Border Detachment had its Command, Staff and supporting units. The number of the detachments varied through the Communist Era from 8 sectors at the formation of the Border Troops, to 10 in 1950 and 17 at the height of the service's build-up, to 12 in 1989, of which 1 was a training formation. The organization of the Border Troops, as published by the Committee for Disclosing the Documents and Announcing Affiliation of Bulgarian Citizens to the State Security and Intelligence Services of the Bulgarian People's Army (A public commission, authorised by law of the Parliament to study the repressive apparatus of the Communist regime and to establish the connection of individuals to it) in a collection book of declassified documents, was as follows:

Directorate of the Border Troops (Управление на Гранични войски (УГВ))
 Headquarters (Щаб, with 11 departments, such as Operations; Combat Training; Communications; Engineering etc.)
 Intelligence Section (Разузнавателно отделение (РО))
 Intelligence Desk (Разузнаване (Р))
 Counter-Intelligence Desk (Контраразузнаване (К))
 Political Section (Политическо отделение (ПО), with 8 departments, such as Political Education; Editorial of the Border Troops official magazine; Technical Editorial; Library etc.)
 Rear (Тил, logistical services, 5 departments)
 Training Border Detachment (Учебен Граничен Отряд (УГО)) (Ivaylovgrad, former 18th Border Detachment)
 Sergeant School for Working Dog Handlers (Сержантска школа за инструктори на служебни кучета (СШИСК) (Berkovitsa)
 Supply and Support Battalion (Батальон за Обслужване и Осигуряване (БОО))
 Border Detachments:
 1st Border Detachment - Vidin (1ви Граничен Отряд – Видин (1 ГО)) 
 including a Border Ships Division (Дивизион Гранични Кораби) for patrols on the Danube river
 2nd Border Detachment - Dragoman (2ри Граничен Отряд – Драгоман (2 ГО)) 
 11th Border Detachment - Kyustendil (11ти Граничен Отряд – Кюстендил (11 ГО)) 
 3rd Border Detachment - Petrich (3ти Граничен Отряд – Петрич (3 ГО)) 
 6th Border Detachment - Gotse Delchev (6ти Граничен Отряд – Гоце Делчев (16 ГО)) 
 4th Border Detachment - Smolyan (4ти Граничен Отряд – Смолян (4 ГО)) 
 5th Border Detachment - Momchilgrad (5ти Граничен Отряд – Момчилград (5 ГО)) 
 13th Border Detachment - Lyubimets (13ти Граничен Отряд – Любимец (13 ГО)) 
 6th Border Detachment - Elhovo (6ти Граничен Отряд – Елхово (6 ГО)) 
 7th Border Detachment - Malko Tarnovo (7ми Граничен Отряд – Малко Търново (7 ГО)) 
 8th Border Detachment - Burgas (8ми Граничен Отряд – Бургас (8 ГО)) 
 including a Border Ships Division (Дивизион Гранични Кораби) for patrols on the Bulgarian Black Sea coastline
The border guards were conscripts, which underwent their training at the border detachment they were assigned to. After that those, who have displayed higher skills in the training process were sent to the Training Border Detachment for an NCO course. Of them small numbers were selected for training as working dog handlers at the K-9 Sergeant School. The officer candidates of the Border Troops studied at the Ground Forces Combined Arms Higher School in Veliko Tarnovo and the career development of Border Troops officers was carried out through courses at the Military Academy in Sofia and training institutes of the Soviet Border Troops in the Soviet Union.

Interior Troops 
The Interior Troops (Bulgarian: Вътрешни Войски (ВВ)) did not exist throughout the whole period of Communist rule in Bulgaria. They were formed during two distinct periods in the presence of a significant organized paramilitary force in opposition to the regime. The first such threat was the Goryani movement. In a report to the Central Committee of the Bulgarian Communist Party dated from October 12, 1948, the at the time Minister of the Interior Anton Yugov informs that for combating the anti-communist partizans 13 special combat units with 1 350 men in total have been formed. He brings to the attention of the committee, that due to their composition of regular Militsioners, family men in their mid-30s and older, a rising tension and physical strain has been observed because of the long periods of patrolling and fighting in the mountains where the Goryanes were active. For that reason Yugov suggests that a specialized Interior Troops arm should be formed in order to facilitate the utilization of conscripts for the Ministry of the Interior with the same conditions of military service as the conscripts of the Bulgarian Army, but trained in the specific counter-insurgency skills needed for such operations. In his report the minister suggests that initially about 1 000 conscripts should be trained by the 13 special combat units in order to relieve their personnel, after which additional 3 000 should be inducted to boost their numbers, with the corresponding reduction in manpower of the regular Militsiya by 3 000 men. Later the numbers of the IT increased to a division and even after the Goryani movement was destroyed their build-up continued to over 12 000 in two divisions and two specialized brigades with their own tanks, artillery, AAA, combat engineers etc., before their abrupt disbandment in 1961.

The second installment of the Bulgarian Interior Troops is from 1985 in connection to the Revival Process. A wave of terror attacks in the first half of the 1980s, including a bomb attack on a special passenger train coach for mothers traveling with little children on March 9, 1985, at Bunovo railway station, organized by the Turkish National-Liberation Movement terror organization, called for the re-establishment of a dedicated counter-insurgency paramilitary force in the structure of the Ministry of the Interior, to deal with the internal terror threat in cooperation with the State Security (Държавна Сигурност (ДС)) and the People's Militsiya (Народна Милиция (НМ)). The Interior Troops were tasked with counter-insurgency in mountainous and woodland terrain, riot control and security of locations of particular and strategic importance. The force was reinstated in 1985 and at the Boyana Roundtable Conference in the first half of 1990 convened between the Bulgarian Communist Party (recently renamed to Bulgarian Socialist Party) and the Union of Democratic Forces to reach an agreement about the reform of the country in light of radical changes in Eastern Europe it was publicly made clear (in response to a question about that), that the Interior Troops number 2 000 men in 6 battalions, plus the SOBT. The latter however is incorrect. The Specialized Counter-Terrorism Force (abbreviated SOBT in Bulgarian) has from its formation to present day (2017) been the premier counter-terrorism unit of the country, strategically subordinated directly to the Minister of the Interior as an independent agency in its own right. The confusion comes from the fact, that a security regiment of the IT has been based in Vranya, near the former Vrana Palace in barracks recently vacated by the State Security's Fifth Department (Department for Safety and Protection) (Пето управление (Управление за безопасност и охрана (УБО)), the higher state functionaries' close protection service. Since the abolition of the Bulgarian monarchy the palace has been turned into an official residence with permanent presence from the Ministry of the Interior. The battalion in question was the quick reaction paramilitary force for the capital Sofia. In fact the Vranya Battalion and the SOBT are located in adjacent barracks, which causes the confusion. The Interior Troops battalions were organised as rifle battalions with BTR-60s, trucks, automatic rifles, machine guns, mortars and anti-tank rockets. In 1990-91 the Border and the Interior Troops were amalgamated into the Troops of the Ministry of the Interior (Войски на МВР), then separated again. In 1993 the Interior Troops were renamed into Gendarmery, the traditional name from the time of the monarchy, banned after that for their role in hunting down communist partizans. Recently the Gendarmery has been absorbed into the Ministry of the Interior's Main Directorate "National Police" and as of 2017 the former Interior Troops and Gendarmery after that exist in the form of Specialized Police Forces (Специализирани Полицейски Сили) within the National Police. In 1989 they consisted of:
 Interior Troops Directorate (Управление "Вътрешни войски") (Sofia) (Detachment 72300)
 1st Independent Operational Security Regiment (1ви Самостоятелен Оперативно-охранителен Полк) (Vrana Palace, Sofia) (Detachment 72345 (44270 before the establishment of the IT))
 1st Independent Operational Battalion (1ви Самостоятелен Оперативен Батальон) (Kardzhali) (Detachment 72350)
 2nd Independent Operational Battalion (2ри Самостоятелен Оперативен Батальон) (Razgrad) (Detachment 72355)
 3rd Independent Operational Battalion (3ти Самостоятелен Оперативен Батальон) (Dzhebel) (Detachment 72360)
 4th Independent Operational Battalion (4ти Самостоятелен Оперативен Батальон) (Novi Pazar) (Detachment 72365)
 5th Independent Operational Battalion (5ти Самостоятелен Оперативен Батальон) (Brezovo) (Detachment 72370)
 6th Independent Operational Battalion (6ти Самостоятелен Оперативен Батальон) (Burgas) (Detachment 72375)

Organisation 
The Ministry is headed by the Minister of Interior Affairs. The position is considered a power appointment and in the modern Bulgarian history (both during the Socialist period and in the post-1989 democratic period) the Minister is also a Deputy Prime Minister. The Deputy Ministers and a Parliament Secretary form his Political Cabinet along with the Chief of the Political Cabinet.

The professional head of the Ministry's operational agencies is the Chief Secretary of the Ministry of Interior (Bulgarian: Главен секретар на МВР). This is simultaneously a position and the highest officer rank within the Ministry. The role and rank of the Chief Secretary is similar to those of the Chief of Defence within the Bulgarian Ministry of Defence. Three times (and current as of 2019) Prime Minister Boyko Borisov has started his political career after his tenure as Chief Secretary. The head of the Ministry's civil servants is the Administrative Secretary of the Ministry of Interior (Bulgarian: Административен секретар на МВР), responsible for human resources, budget planning, real estates of the Ministry, public relations etc. The rest of organisations within the Ministry (the academy, the Medical Service, the Scientific Studies Institute of Criminology, the Institute of Psychology, the CIS Directorate, internal affairs, financial comptrollers, international cooperation etc.) are directly subordinated to the Minister.

Bulgaria is a unitary state composed of 28 provinces - the capital city of Sofia (an oblast in its own right) and 27 oblasts. The agencies within the Ministry (called Main Directorates and Directorates) are organised at national level under the Chief Secretary. There is also an Oblast Directorate of the Ministry of Interior Affairs (abbreviated ODMVR and followed by the name of the province) within each of the provinces (called oblasts). The only exception is the city of Sofia. Due to its status as the nation's capital, economic powerhouse, most highly and densely populated city and for traditional reasons the Sofia equivalent of the 27 ODMVRs is actually called SDVR, which stands for Capital Directorate for Interior Affairs. These regional departments are also ultimately subordinated to the Chief Secretary. The 27 ODMVRs range in manpower from  about 400 (of ODMVR Silistra) to a little over 1 900 (of ODMVR Plovdiv) police officers and civil servants. They are dwarfed by the SDVR of the capital Sofia with its almost 5 100 police officers and civil servants (the ODMVR Sofia, which covers the province around, but excluding the city itself, counts a total of 1 030).

Operational agencies under the Chief Secretary

Main Directorate of Gendarmerie, Special Operations and Counter-Terror 
A 2020 reform plan of the government called for the integration of the Ministry's primary counter-terror unit - the SOBT and the Gendarmerie Directorate into a new Main Directorate of Gendarmerie, Special Operations and Counter-Terror (Главна дирекция жандармерия, специални операции и борба с тероризма" - ГДЖСОБТ) (in a manner similar to the amalgamation of the French Gendarmerie's GIGN and territorial quick reaction units). The plan has encountered serious criticism from within and without the Ministry of the Interior, political parties and security, public order and counter-terror experts. Major reason for concern is the view, that this action is politically motivated. Bulgaria is a parliamentary republic and the Cabinet of Ministers is the executive power in the country. The security of all high ranking state officials of the legislature, executive and judiciary however was the exclusive jurisdiction of the National Close Protection Service. The NCPS is an agency subordinated to the Office of the President of the Republic of Bulgaria. In the Bulgarian political structure the President is not part of the executive and this is a source of ever present tension between him and the incumbent Prime Minister. In the middle of 2020 the Chief Public Prosecutor Ivan Geshev (by Constitution the Bulgarian State Prosecution is part of the legislature) broke the NCPS monopoly by waiving his protection detail by the service and forming a new one under the Protection Bureau (Бюро за охрана). The Bureau of less than a hundred employees acts as a witness protection service under direct subordination to the Main Prosecution (Главна прокуратура, the Office of the Chief Public Prosecutor). At the same time the parliamentary faction of the main ruling party motioned through parliament the project for the new agency with the significant addition of close protection of high ranking state officials to the missions already assigned to the SFCT and the Gendarmerie. The reform project passed through Parliament in the end of 2020 and took effect on January 1, 2021.

Specialised Force for Combating Terrorism 
The SOBT (Bulgarian: Специализиран отряд за Борба с тероризма, СОБТ) is the country's premier counter-terror unit. It consists of roughly 150 operatives and staff and support personnel. It is located near the former royal residence in the Vrana area at the outskirts of the capital Sofia. The Force is directly subordinated to the Minister and engages in the most complicated cases. Most of the other agencies within the ministry have their own SWAT teams and the occasions in which the SOBT has been deployed in operations have decreased in the 21st century. The Force trains regularly with the special forces of the Bulgarian Army, the SWAT teams of the Sofia Police Department (SDVR), the Main Directorate "Combat Against The Organised Crime" (GDBOP), the Gendarmery, the Border Police and teams of the Attorney General's Office, as well as similar foreign CT units, such as the French RAID, the German GSG 9 etc.

Directorate “Gendarmery” 
The Gendarmery Directorate is the main militarised arm for riot control, security of critical infrastructure of national importance, such as nuclear power plants, ports, pipelines, foreign embassies and diplomatic missions in the Republic of Bulgaria. The National Police is organised in central departments under the Main Directorate in Sofia and 28 provincial departments. The Gendarmery does not follow that model, instead it is organised in a small central apparatus and 8 Zonal Gendarmery Departments, covering multiple provinces. Unlike classic examples such as the French Gendarmerie nationale, the Italian Carabinieri, the Turkish Jandarma or the Dutch Koninklijke Marechaussee the Bulgarian Gendarmery has no task to enforce military discipline in the Armed Forces. This is the jurisdiction of the Military Police Service under the Bulgarian Ministry of Defence.

 Director of Gendarmery
 services directly subordinated to the Director
 Zonal Gendarmery Department Sofia
 Zonal Gendarmery Department Montana
 Zonal Gendarmery Department Pleven
 Zonal Gendarmery Department Gorna Oryahovitsa
 Zonal Gendarmery Department Varna
 Zonal Gendarmery Department Burgas
 Zonal Gendarmery Department Plovdiv
 Zonal Gendarmery Department Kardzhali

Main Directorate "National Police" 
The Main Directorate "National Police" (Bulgarian: Главна дирекция "Национална полиция", ГДНП) is the nations's primary law enforcement organisation. It includes various services, such as Security Police, Criminal Police, Transport Police, Traffic Police etc. It also included the Gendarmery Directorate until January 1, 2021.

 Director of MDNP
 "Criminal Contingent and Prevention" Sector
 "Operational Analysis Centre" Sector
 "Expert-Criminalistic Activities" Sector
 Deputy Director of MDNP in charge of 
 Criminal Police
 Economic Police
 Deputy Director of MDNP in charge of 
 Investigative Department
 Department for Methodic Guidance of Investigations 
 Deputy Director of MDNP in charge of 
 Security Police
 Traffic Police

Main Directorate "Combat Against The Organised Crime" 
The Main Directorate is tasked with the prevention of serious crimes such as drug trafficking, human trafficking, abductions etc. Due to its purpose it is also colloquially known as the anti-Mafia service.

Main Directorate "Border Police" 
The Main Directorate "Border Police" is responsible for the security of the border crossings and the prevention of illegal entering of the territory of the Republic of Bulgaria. The service does not carry law enforcement tasks in the interior of the country, however, operating highly sophisticated land-based surveillance equipment, helicopters and sea and riverine patrol craft, the Border Police is regularly engaged in search and rescue operations for missing persons and pursuit of dangerous criminals in a supporting capacity.

 Director of Border Police
 services directly subordinated to the Director
 Regional Directorate "Border Police" - Airports (Sofia)
Border Police HQ Sofia IAP
Border Police HQ Plovdiv IAP
Border Police HQ Varna IAP
Border Police HQ Burgas IAP
 Regional Directorate "Border Police" - Ruse
 Border Police Ships Base - Vidin
 Regional Directorate "Border Police" - Burgas
 Border Police Ships Base - Sozopol
 Regional Directorate "Border Police" - Elhovo
 Regional Directorate "Border Police" - Smolyan
 Regional Directorate "Border Police" - Kyustendil
 Regional Directorate "Border Police" - Dragoman
 Specialised Aerial Surveillance Unit (Sofia IAP)
Sofia (Aviation) Base - 1 x AgustaWestland AW139, 3 x AgustaWestland AW109P
Bezmer (Aviation) Base - helicopters on temporary deployment from Sofia Base

Main Directorate "Fire Safety and Civil Protection" 
The Main Directorate (Bulgarian: Главна дирекция "Пожарна безопасност и защита на населението") is responsible for fire-fighting, reaction to natural disasters, emergency situations and rescue operations. The Civil Protection portfolio was for a long time under the Ministry of Defence. The Stanishev Government has combined the MIA's fire-fighting service, the MoD's civil protection service and the wartime stocks agency of the Council of Ministers into a new "mega" Ministry of Emergency Situations. The new ministry was later dissolved, with the fire fighters returning under the MIA and the wartime stocks administration returning to the oversight of the Council of Ministers. Civil Protection was retained merged with the Fire Protection Service and joined the MIA. The Main Directorate consists of departments directly under the Director of the service and 28 territorial departments (the Capital Directorate for Fire Safety and Civil Protection in Sofia and 27 Regional Directorates for Fire Safety and Civil Protection

in each of the 27 oblasts).

List of ministers

References

External links 
 

Interior
Bulgaria
Law of Bulgaria
1879 establishments in Bulgaria